Caṇḍeśvara Thakkura was a Maithili-language political theorist and warrior during the 14th century. He served as minister for peace and war and chief judge in the court of Harisimhadeva who was the last King of the Karnat dynasty of Mithila in modern-day northern Bihar of India and parts of Southern Nepal. His family had their origins in the village of Bisfi in Madhubani district of Bihar.

Among his most notable works was the Rājanītiratnākara, a treatise on organising the state. Further to this, he also wrote a set of seven books that dealt with issues relating to the law among other themes. These were titled the Krityaratnākara, Dānaratnākara, Vyavahāraratnākara, Śuddhiratnākara, Pūjāratnākara, Vivādaratnākara, and Gṛihastharatnākara. Together, these books are referred to as Saptaratnākara.

Primary sources from the time describe him as a great diplomat and a successful minister cum commander who participated in battles against mlecchas (possibly referring to Muslim invasions) as well as leading a successful military expedition to Nepal where he is said to have distributed gold equal in weight to himself on the banks of the Bagmati River in 1314.

Family
Chandeshvar was born in a family of Maithil Brahmins who were also learned scholars who worked in the Karnat court. He was the cousin of Jayadatta who was the grandfather of the famous Vidyapati who worked in the court of the Oiniwar dynasty a century after Candesvara's time. Candesvara was also the grandson of another famous scholar, Devāditya Ṭhakkura who was described as a "minister for War and Peace" in the court of the Karnat dynasty.

Candesvara most likely became a minister for peace and war for Harisimhadeva in 1310 C.E.

Karnat invasion of Nepal
Under Caṇḍeśvara's leadership and with the support of the King Harisimhadeva, the Karnatas of Mithila made an attack on Nepal in 1314. The Karnats made the city of Bhaktapur their focus and plundered the city. After this, they targeted Lalitpur and continued looting and plundering the region.

References

Scholars from Bihar
Mithila